Selnica  may refer to:

In Croatia:
 Selnica, Krapina-Zagorje County, village in Krapina-Zagorje County
 Selnica, Međimurje County, municipality in Međimurje County
 Selnica Podravska, village in Koprivnica-Križevci County
 Selnica Šćitarjevska, village in Zagreb County

In Slovenia:
 Selnica ob Dravi, village in Drava Statistical Region
 Selnica ob Muri, village in Drava Statistical Region